Opopanax chironium, common name Hercules' all-heal, is a herb of the family Apiaceae.

Subspecies
Opopanax chironium subsp. chironium
Opopanax chironium subsp. bulgaricum (Vel.) N.Andreev

Description
This perennial herb has a branching stem, thick and rough close to the base. Leaves are serrate, pinnate, with long petioles. It produces a large, flat, yellow inflorescence at the top of the branches.

Uses
A gum resin (mostly gum) known as opopanax can be extracted from this plant by cutting at the base of a stem and sun-drying the juice that flows out. It has a strong unpleasant odor, unlike the perfumery's opopanax which is aromatic.

The resin has been used in the treatment of spasms, and, before that, as an emmenagogue, in the treatment of asthma, chronic visceral infections, hysteria and hypochondria. Opopanax resin is most frequently sold in dried irregular pieces, though tear-shaped gems are not uncommon.

Distribution and habitat
The plant thrives in warm climates like Iran, Italy, Greece and Turkey, but also grows in cooler climates. Some view opopanax grown in cooler climates as being of inferior quality.

References

 Tutin, T. G. et al., eds. 1964–1980. Flora Europaea.

Apioideae